This is a list of telenovelas and dramatic series produced by Grupo Imagen, which from 2010 to 2015 were broadcast 13 productions in Cadenatres, under the concept of "Originales de Cadenatres" (Cadenatres Originals), and from 2016 to date, the rest since the start of transmissions in his succession channel, Imagen Televisión.

List

2010s

References 

 
Grupo Imagen